New York's 73rd State Assembly district is one of the 150 districts in the New York State Assembly. It has been represented by Alex Bores since 2023, succeeding Dan Quart.

Geography 
District 73 is located in Manhattan, comprising portions of the Upper East Side, Midtown East, Turtle Bay and Sutton Place. Notable places such as Grand Central Terminal, the Chrysler Building and the Guggenheim are within this district.

Recent election results

2022

2020

2018

2016

2014

2012

References

73